Thomas J. Basile (born October 22, 1975) is an American businessman, political commentator, and Republican politician in New York. He served in the George W. Bush administration in various capacities, including in Iraq, and was the executive director of the New York Republican Party from 2009–2011.

Basile was a councilman in Stony Point, New York, and currently runs the strategic communications firm Empire Solutions. He is the author of the 2017 book Tough Sell: Fighting The Media War In Iraq, writes for FoxNews.com and Newsmax, and hosts the Newsmax TV program "America Right Now".

Early life and education
Basile grew up in Clarkstown, New York, in Rockland County. He attended Clarkstown High School South.

Basile graduated from Hofstra University in 1997, with a BA in political science and history. He then earned a JD from the Fordham University School of Law.

Career
In 1997, after graduating from Hofstra, Basile ran as a Republican for Clarkstown Town Supervisor. The incumbent Democrat went on to win. From 1997–2000, Basile served in Governor George Pataki's administration as Public Relations Director for the New York State Office of Parks Recreation and Historic Preservation.

Basile worked on the 2000 Bush–Cheney presidential campaign and was a consultant to the Republican National Committee during the 2004 Presidential election.

In the George W. Bush administration, Basile served as Director of Communications for the U.S. Environmental Protection Agency (EPA) under Christine Todd Whitman. From 2003–2004, Basile served in Iraq as senior advisor to the Coalition Provisional Authority (CPA) under Paul Bremer. The U.S. Department of Defense subsequently awarded him the Joint Civilian Service Commendation for his service with the CPA. Basile was also the press secretary for the second inauguration of George W. Bush in January 2005.

From 2009–2011, Basile was executive director of the New York Republican Party. With David Webb, Basile co-founded TeaParty365, the New York City metropolitan area chapter of the Tea Party movement.

Basile has served as a councilman in Stony Point, New York, since January 2014. He also serves as the Deputy Town Supervisor. Basile and Webb were featured in the 2011 Time Person of the Year report, "The Protester", as leaders in the Tea Party Movement.

In 2018, Basile unsuccessfully ran for a seat in the New York State Senate to represent the 39th district, defeated by Democrat James Skoufis.

Basile heads the strategic communications firm Empire Solutions, which he founded in 2005 after leaving government. He is the former host of Sunday in America on Sirius XM radio, where he continues to contribute. Basile is also an adjunct professor at Fordham University's Graduate School of Arts and Sciences.

Publications and writings
Basile wrote the 2017 book Tough Sell: Fighting The Media War In Iraq, published by Potomac Books. The book's foreword is by Ambassador John Bolton. In the book, he relates his firsthand experiences in Baghdad during the Iraq War and criticizes the media for biased coverage. While he defends the Bush administration's decision to launch the war, he is critical of the communications strategy to defend the policy. Reviewing the book in the U.S. Army War College journal Parameters, James P. Farwell wrote, "Basile merits high credit for his patriotic service and his thought-provoking book that provides keen insights into what it takes to make strategic communication in war zones a success and into the obstacles to good strategic communication. Tough Sell is highly recommended.

Personal life
Basile resides in Stony Point, New York, with his wife and their three children. He is a Knight Commander with Star in the Roman Catholic Order of the Holy Sepulchre.

References

External links
 
 

Living people
1975 births
Politicians from Rockland County, New York
New York (state) Republicans
George W. Bush administration personnel
American political writers
Conservatism in the United States
Hofstra University alumni
Fordham University School of Law alumni
Newsmax TV people